Rheocles derhami is a species of rainbowfish in the subfamily Bedotiinae, the Madagascar rainbowfishes. It is endemic to the Ambalona River and Mangarahar River in Madagascar.  Its natural habitat is rivers. It was described by Melanie Stiassny and Damaris Rodriguez in 1992 and was named in honour of the Swiss conservationist Patrick De Rham.

References

derhami
Freshwater fish of Madagascar
Taxonomy articles created by Polbot
Fish described in 1992